Ian Broun Sprague  (1920–1994) was an Australian twentieth-century studio potter, ceramic sculptor and graphic artist. Delayed by the Second World War and a false start in architecture, he spent (broadly) his forties adapting Australian domestic pottery to a Japanese aesthetic of contemplative use; his fifties as a sculptor in two- and three-dimensional pottery; his sixties and seventies making landscape works on paper.

Early life
Sprague was born in Geelong, Victoria, Australia, in 1920. He was the sixth and last child of Leslie Sprague, a wealthy grazier and Marion Broun, Armidale-born descendant of the Scottish Broun baronets. He was educated at Geelong Grammar. Trained as an architectural draughtsman, Sprague spent the Second World War in the AIF in New Guinea as a signals officer. After the war he went to the University of Melbourne and completed an architecture degree in 1950. But he found the next ten years in architects' offices in Melbourne and London tedious and  unsatisfying.

Sprague was 6 ft. 1 in. tall with fair hair and blue eyes. He appeared at Government House parties and as best man at fashionable weddings, but he never married. On a driving holiday in Scotland in 1957, he had a car accident that put him in hospital for five months. One knee was permanently damaged and a frequent source of pain. His surgeon suggested he restore the strength of his arms by taking up a craft.

Pottery

Sprague attended the London Central School of Arts and Crafts from 1958 to 1960. He spent two months at the David Leach pottery in Devon. He returned to Australia in February 1962, planning to make ethical pots in the Anglo–Japanese tradition founded by Bernard Leach, David's father. Sprague bought a 15-acre estate in Upper Beaconsfield, Victoria.

I had this whole setup clearly in mind. I wanted to live out of Melbourne. I wanted to have animals, some land, and to be completely free to do what I wanted.

On the estate he set up a pottery, designed and built a new house nearby and renovated an existing five-room cottage. From England he had imported a Homer kiln capable of the high temperatures needed to make stoneware and porcelain rather than earthenware, and a Boulton's cone-driven wheel and pugmill. The equipment was on a commercial scale but devoted to studio work. The pottery was called Mungeribar: "red clay" in the local Aboriginal (Woiwurrung) language.

… we finally arrived at a stoneware body mixing a local fireclay with commercial red clay, china clay and ball clay … it works well and reduces to a red-brown with lighter speckling … Most of the glazes we use are, as a result, in the darker earthy colours but speckled light greys and ochres are also possible.

The Mungeribar Pottery's mark is a Macdonald's em impressed; Sprague's personal mark is a capital I over a horizontal separator and the Morse code for S—three dots. Some pots are signed "IanS". Drawings and paintings are signed "Ian Sprague"; work signed simply "Sprague" is generally by his nephew Leslie.

Sprague had met and liked the potter and Slade School technician Robin Welch (b. 1936) in England. He paid for Welch and his family to come to Mungeribar in 1962 so Welch could help him set up a fully professional pottery. The Welches returned to England in 1965. In the October 1965 issue of Pottery in Australia, Sprague described their successes and failures in setting up the pottery. The description and plans are so detailed as to amount to a specification for would-be imitators. Sprague produced a full range of functional domestic pottery from 1964 to 1980.

In 1964 he established the Craft Centre in South Yarra, "a display centre and exhibition gallery for Australia's highest standard craft work". Sprague thus had control of every step of production from mixing the clay to passing wrapped pots over the counter. The Centre was owned and stocked entirely by him, and he travelled all over Australia in search of the best pottery, textiles, glassware, woodwork and jewellery. The opening exhibition showed the pottery of Robin Welch. Sprague sold the Centre in 1967, but soon started a campaign for a government funded centre, eventually established as the Meat Market Craft Centre in North Melbourne.
In 1971 Sprague became president of the recently established Craft Association of Victoria. Dismayed by the quality of teaching in art schools and technical colleges, he ran many workshops around the country on the textural treatment of clay.

I feel that one should contribute something for the common good, although often a tremendous amount of one's creative work-time is used … Establishing and running a property, collecting paintings by Australian artists, pop and classical records and continually entertaining friends and visitors has not left me enough time for my own work.

Functional pottery

On one view, Sprague never produced great quantities of work himself; he was a self-effacing craftsman, not inclined to promote or exhibit his work. Yet he fired about 1,500 domestic pots of his own each year and scores of them are now in public collections.

The brown stonewares, the nicely formed functional breadcrocks, teapots, fruit platters and teacups and saucers … made his a household name among the 1970s cognoscenti.

Victor Greenaway was his apprentice 1969–73. (Greenaway's mark in his Mungeribar years was an impressed capital G.) Greenaway eventually became Sprague's friend and occasional manager. He considered Sprague
a gentleman potter … exceptionally skilled at his craft … For Welch, the greatest pleasure was to see shelves full of multiples of his own work but for Sprague, his objective was to place the hand-made piece of pottery in the house — making cups and saucers and beautiful objects to use and feel and generally appreciate.

In 1973 Sprague excised two acres of Mungeribar to provide Greenaway with land for a house of his own. The other apprentices at Mungeribar were Grattan Burley (for six months), Christopher Sanders (1976–78), who became a lifelong friend, and Trevor Hanby (1978–80). After 14 years of hands-on pottery making, Sprague ceded to Hanby the job of developing a full range of pots to be sold under the Mungeribar mark.

In 1965 the famous Japanese potter Shōji Hamada had made a range of pots at Mungeribar; they are now in the Hamilton Gallery. The Japanese potter Tatsuzo Shimaoka worked at Mungeribar in 1972. Throughout the 1970s such international masters as Harry Davis, Ian Auld, Fujiwara Yu and Michael Cardew visited.

Non-functional pottery

In the mid-1970s Sprague, following Robin Welch, produced a series of sculptures by adding anthropomorphic features to spindly thrown pots. Bearing such names as Critic, Totem and Warrior, they look like excavated chthonic mannikins.

Ovoid forms originated on the wheel but were beaten and scraped into expressive asymmetry and ornamented with clay disks and straps. A large group of these was shown at Leveson Street Gallery, North Melbourne, in December 1980.

From 1973 at the latest he specialised in fireclay panels for architectural use as wall plaques or free-standing sculptures (Littlemore's Nine Artist Potters first edition of 1973 has photos of six of them). Later examples have a spine of coloured glass in clay wells.

Sprague produced his wall panels by cutting them from fireclay blocks, heating and scraping them, and applying bold simplified motifs. These rugged clay surfaces were often finished simply by pouring a strong solution of salted water on to their surfaces … [firing] resulting in a warm toasted surface effect.

The hand-modelled clay panels … combine expressive abstract forms and a rare understanding of the modulation of two dimensional relief sculpture.

Generally the panels were in groups of three, but installations of 8 panels (two by four), 42 (seven by six) or 27 (three by nine) were made, notably for the Modernist Beaumaris house of sculptor and portrait painter Shirley Hannan. Hannan was one of many clients who became admiring friends.

Single panels were sometimes glazed bas-relief sculptures.

Sprague laid out a design of 20,000 ceramic tiles in the Fitzroy Gardens, Melbourne, in 1979 to form a "people's pathway". Four years later he contributed a "cave seat" to another community art-work, the Terracotta Mural Garden at Benalla, Victoria.

Later life

By 1981 Mungeribar was too onerous and too cold for Sprague's health. He sold the Upper Beaconsfield estate and moved to a house and studio he had bought at Mooney Mooney on the Hawkesbury River. He made pots and sculptures in a small pottery as well as works on paper. These include lithographs and monoprints. There are many drawings of the river, boats, the rocky escarpments. Other drawings are of his whippet Sprint. In 1992 he moved to a smaller house and studio at Sunshine Beach north of Noosa, Queensland. He died there two years later.

Mungeribar had been consumed by a firestorm on Ash Wednesday 1983.

Reputation
Ian Sprague: studio potter 1920–1994, a retrospective exhibition curated by Relton Leaver, was held at the Victorian State Craft Collection Gallery in 1995. The review in The Age, headed "Master potter hailed", wrote of his "legendary contribution to contemporary ceramics".

Examples of Sprague's work are held by the National Gallery of Australia, Canberra; the National Gallery of Victoria; the Victorian Ceramic Group; the Powerhouse Museum, Sydney; the Ian Potter Museum of Art.

Photos
A photo of Sprague by Mark Strizic in the collection of the National Gallery of Victoria is available online as Ian B. Sprague (1960s). It provides a rare glimpse of him working on a ceramic sculpture.

A photo by Kraig Carlstrom in Nine Artist Potters shows Sprague at Mungeribar in the late 1970s wearing a zippered turtleneck jumper over blue denim flares.

Gallery

1950s

1960s

1970s

1980s

1990s

References

1920 births
1994 deaths
Australian potters
Australian ceramicists
People educated at Geelong Grammar School
20th-century ceramists
Studio pottery